The WZ-111 heavy tank was a heavy tank that was developed by the People's Republic of China (PRC) during the 1960s but was eventually cancelled in 1966 due to many mechanical problems.

History
The WZ-111 featured a  supercharged diesel engine and a torsion bar suspension system. The idler wheels were in front with drive sprockets in the rear. Many of the suspension components were the same type used in Soviet heavy tank designs such as the IS-2.

The first prototype began testing in 1964. This prototype lacked a turret, but was fitted with a steel weight to simulate the actual mass of the turret during testing. Because of many technological problems that surfaced during testing, the design was shelved around 1966.
A WZ-111 tank hull is now displayed at the Tank Museum near Beijing.

See also
WZ-132
Type 69

References

Military vehicles introduced in the 1960s
Tanks of the People's Republic of China
Heavy tanks of the Cold War